The 2015–16 Segunda División season, also known as Liga Adelante for sponsorship reasons, was the 85th since its establishment.

Teams

Promotion and relegation (pre-season)
A total of 22 teams contested the league, including 15 sides from the 2014–15 season, four promoted from the 2014–15 Segunda División B and three relegated from the 2014–15 La Liga.

Relegated from 2014–15 La Liga

Elche (administrative relegation)
Almería
Córdoba

Promoted from 2014–15 Segunda División B

Oviedo
Gimnàstic
Bilbao Athletic
Huesca

Stadia and locations

Personnel and sponsorship

Managerial changes

League table

Positions by round

Results

Promotion play-offs

Teams placed between 3rd and 6th position (excluding reserve teams) will take part in the promotion play-offs. The first leg of the semi-finals will be played on 8 June and the second leg on 12 June at home of the best positioned team. The final will also be two-legged, with the first leg on 15 June and the second leg on 19 June, with the best positioned team also playing the second leg at home.

Season statistics

Top goalscorers

Zamora Trophy
The Zamora Trophy is awarded by newspaper Marca to the goalkeeper with least goals-to-games ratio. Keepers must play at least 28 games of 60 or more minutes to be eligible for the trophy.

Attendances

Awards

References

External links
LFP website

 
2015-16
2
Spain